The 1998–99 DFB-Pokal was the 56th season of the annual German football cup competition. Sixty-four teams competed in the tournament of six rounds which began on 28 August 1998 and ended on 6 June 1999. In the final Werder Bremen defeated Bayern Munich 5–4 on penalties, thereby claiming their fourth title.

Matches

First round

Second round

Round of 16

Quarter-finals

Semi-finals

Final

References

External links
 Official site of the DFB 
 Kicker.de 

1998-99
1998–99 in German football cups